The Black Stallion is a 1979 American adventure film based on the 1941 classic children's novel of the same name by Walter Farley. The film starts in 1946, five years after the book was published. It tells the story of Alec Ramsey, a boy who is shipwrecked on a deserted island with a wild Arabian stallion that he befriends. After being rescued, they are set on entering a race challenging two champion horses.

The film is adapted by Melissa Mathison, Jeanne Rosenberg, and William D. Wittliff. It was directed by Carroll Ballard and stars Kelly Reno, Teri Garr, Hoyt Axton, Mickey Rooney, and the Arabian horse Cass Ole. The film features music by Carmine Coppola, the father of Hollywood producer Francis Ford Coppola, who is credited as executive producer.

In 2002, The Black Stallion was included in the annual selection of 25 motion pictures for preservation in the United States National Film Registry by the Library of Congress as being "culturally, historically, or aesthetically significant".

Plot
In the summer of 1946, Alec Ramsey is travelling by steamer off the coast of North Africa, where he sees a wild black stallion being forced into a makeshift stable and heavily restrained by ropes leading to his halter. Captivated by the horse, Alec later sneaks to the horse to feed him some sugar cubes, but he is caught by the horse's supposed owner, who tells him in Arabic to stay away from Shetan. After shoving the boy away, he gluttonously helps himself to the sugar.

Later in his bunk, Alec's father shows Alec his winnings from a card game and gives him a pocket knife and a small statue of Bucephalus, and tells the story of how Alexander the Great became Bucephalus's master. Later that night, Alec is thrown out of his bunk during a storm. Alec, being carried by Mr. Ramsey, and the other passengers make their way to the deck. The ship is engulfed in flames and is sinking. Mr. Ramsey tells Alec to stay put next to the stallion's stable as he rushes to help the lifeboat crew. In the chaos, Alec grabs his knife and makes his way to the black stallion and manages to free him. The stallions owner then finds Alec and attempts to steal his life jacket, only to be tackled by Mr. Ramsey. The stallion then jumps into the sea. Alec himself is thrown overboard by the waves. He narrowly misses being pulled into the propeller which is still turning. In the water, he swims toward the stallion and manages to grab hold of the ropes of the stallion's restraints just as the ship explodes, rendering him unconscious.

Alec wakes on the shore of a deserted island and starts to explore. He finds the stallion caught in his restraints with the ropes stuck between the rocks. With his knife, Alec manages to free the stallion once again and the stallion runs away. For a time, the two keep their distance. Alec discovers means to survive by catching fish and seaweed. As Alec suddenly faces a cobra eye to eye, The Black comes to the rescue and kills the snake, only to run off again.

By now, Alec decides to try to get closer to the horse and offer him some seaweed. The hungry stallion finds himself unable to resist, but visibly struggles with his distrust for humans. Eventually, the hunger wins and he takes Alec's offer; their bond has been sealed and the two are now inseparable. After many times falling off the horse, Alec manages to ride the stallion, and they both travel the beaches, united as one. One day, a fishing ship arrives, rescuing both Alec and the stallion.

Back home in America, Alec is given a hero's welcome. The Black has a temporary home in Alec's back yard, but a garbage man not knowing that there is a wild horse in the backyard, is chased by The Black, who races off down the street after being spooked by a passing car. Alec chases after him through every part of town, but loses track of him. The next day, Alec meets Snoe (and Napoleon) who tell him where The Black is. Alec finds the stallion in the barn of Henry Dailey, a retired racehorse jockey, who claims to have spent all night catching The Black. Alec arranges for The Black to stay at the barn.

When Alec wonders how fast The Black is, Alec and Henry decide to train The Black for the racetrack, while Henry teaches Alec how to be a jockey. The Black surprises Henry with his speed. Henry immediately starts planning to get The Black into the match race between the country's current two champions. To do that, he sets up a secret demonstration at night where the press can witness his speed, keeping the identity of Alec and The Black secret. The news spreads about the mystery horse and The Black is entered into the race. However, Alec's mother disapproves of this, fearing that her son would be taking a huge risk as a jockey, before she relents and allows him to ride the horse in the upcoming race.

The race is the most anticipated horseracing event of the year. Before the two champions and The Black enter the starting gate, The Black gets into a fight with one of his opponents, wounding his leg. Alec does not see the wound until he is in the gate. As he dismounts, the bell rings and the horses take off. Alec desperately tries to stay on his horse and trying to stop him. He falls behind, but The Black will not stop. When Alec regains his balance, The Black is well on his way to catch up with his opponents. Alec now encourages The Black to run as fast as he can, remembering the wild rides on the island, as they catch up. The Black eventually wins by two lengths.

Cast
 Kelly Reno as Alec Ramsay
 Mickey Rooney as Henry Dailey
 Teri Garr as Mrs. Ramsay, Alec's Mother
 Hoyt Axton as Mr. Ramsay, Alec's Father
 Clarence Muse as Snoe
 Michael Higgins as Jim Neville
 Ed McNamara as Jake
 Larbi Doghmi as Arab
 John Burton as Jockey #1
 John Buchanan as Jockey #2
 Kristen Vigard as Becky
 Fausto Tozzi as Rescue Captain
 John Karlsen as Archeologist
 Leopoldo Trieste as Priest
 Frank Cousins as African Chieftain
 Don Hudson as Zaurog
 Marne Maitland as Drake Captain
 Tom Dahlgren as The Veterinarian

Horses
Cass Ole, a champion Arabian stallion, was featured in most of the movie's scenes, with Fae Jur, another black Arabian stallion, being his main double. Fae Jur's main scene is the one where Alec is trying to gain the trust of The Black on the beach. Two other stunt doubles were used for running, fighting, and swimming scenes.

El Mokhtar, an Egyptian Arabian racehorse, was the producers' first choice to portray The Black, but they were unable to secure his services for the film from his owners, who declined any offers. He does appear in The Black Stallion Returns, alongside Cass Ole, by which time the studio bought out the syndicate of owners to secure El Mokhtar's services.

Napoleon was portrayed by Junior, that previously appeared in National Lampoon's Animal House as Trooper, Niedermeyer's horse.

Reception
The film was positively received by critics. On Rotten Tomatoes, it holds a 90% approval rating based on 31 reviews, with an average rating of 7.9/10.

Awards and honors

Academy Awards
The film received two nominations for the Academy Awards:
 Mickey Rooney was nominated for Best Actor in a Supporting Role.
 Robert Dalva was nominated for Best Film Editing.

In addition, Alan Splet was awarded with a Special Achievement Award for sound editing.

Golden Globe Awards
Carmine Coppola was nominated for Best Original Score at the Golden Globe Awards. He later won the award in this category for his score of Apocalypse Now.

British Academy Awards
Caleb Deschanel was nominated for Best Cinematography by the British Academy of Film and Television Arts Awards.

LA Film Critics Awards
The film received two awards from the Los Angeles Film Critics Association Awards for Best Cinematography (Caleb Deschanel) and Best Music (Carmine Coppola).

Others
The film also won the 1979 National Society of Film Critics award for Best Cinematography.

In 2002, it was selected for preservation in the United States National Film Registry by the Library of Congress as being "culturally, historically, or aesthetically significant".

Also, the film is recognized by American Film Institute:
 2006: AFI's 100 Years...100 Cheers – #64

Music
In August 2009, Intrada Records released a three-disc special edition of the soundtrack containing the entire score from the film plus bonus material, including unused cues and alternate takes of some tracks as well as a restored re-issue of the original 1979 soundtrack album. This release was limited to 1,500 units.

Home media
The film was released on RCA SelectaVision VideoDisc (CED) in 1981. The film was released on Laserdisc and VHS by Magnetic Video in 1985.  It was re-issued on VHS as part of the MGM/UA Family Entertainment Collection in 1994 and the MGM Family Entertainment Collection in 1997. The film was released on DVD by MGM Home Entertainment in 2004 and re-issued in 2013. A restored print of the film was released on Blu-ray by 20th Century Fox Home Entertainment in 2013. The Criterion Collection released a special edition of the film on DVD and Blu-ray in 2015. This release features a new 4K transfer supervised by Caleb Deschanel, five short films directed by Carroll Ballard, new interviews with Deschanel, Ballard, film critic Scott Foundas and photographer Mary Ellen Mark as well as an essay written by film critic Michael Sragow.

Legacy
The film was followed in 1983 by a sequel, The Black Stallion Returns, which also starred Reno. There was also a television series called The Adventures of the Black Stallion which aired from 1990 to 1993 and starred Mickey Rooney and Richard Ian Cox. In 2003, a 50-minute prequel called The Young Black Stallion, was shot and released for IMAX theaters.

See also
 List of fictional horses

References

Further reading
 The Black Stallion essay by Keith Phipps at National Film Registry. 
 The Black Stallion essay by Daniel Eagan in America's Film Legacy: The Authoritative Guide to the Landmark Movies in the National Film Registry, A&C Black, 2010 , pages 758-759 
 The Black Stallion: Nirvana on Horseback an essay by Michael Sragow at the Criterion Collection

External links

 
 
 
 
 
 
 

1979 films
1979 directorial debut films
American children's films
American horse racing films
American Zoetrope films
Films about horses
Films directed by Carroll Ballard
Films produced by Francis Ford Coppola
Films scored by Carmine Coppola
Films set in 1946
Films set on islands
Films shot in Sardinia
Films that won the Best Sound Editing Academy Award
Films with screenplays by Melissa Mathison
Media containing Gymnopedies
United Artists films
United States National Film Registry films
1970s English-language films
1970s American films